José Jesús Silvestre Cárdenas (born November 28, 1989) is a Mexican professional boxer and the former WBA World minimumweight interim champion. Silvestre is promoted by Saúl Álvarez' company, Canelo Promotions.

Professional career
In February 2012, Silvestre beat the title contender Yader Escobar to become the mandatory challenger for the WBA Minimumweight title.

WBA Minimumweight Championship
On July 14, 2012, Silvestre won a twelve-round decision over Edwin Díaz to capture the WBA Minimumweight Interim title in a fight held at the Auditorio Benito Juárez in Guadalajara, Mexico.

See also
List of Mexican boxing world champions
List of WBA world champions
List of mini-flyweight boxing champions

References

External links

|-

1989 births
Living people
Mexican male boxers
Mini-flyweight boxers
World Boxing Association champions
World mini-flyweight boxing champions
Boxers from Nayarit
Sportspeople from Tepic, Nayarit